The 1954 Grand National was the 108th annual renewal of the Grand National steeplechase that took place at Aintree Racecourse near Liverpool, England, on 10 April 1954.

The race was won by ten-year-old gelding Royal Tan, an 8/1 shot trained by Vincent O'Brien. O'Brien had also trained the previous year's winner, Early Mist, and would secure a third consecutive win the following year with Quare Times. Royal Tan was ridden by jockey Bryan Marshall, who also won his second consecutive Grand National. Tudor Line was second and the 15/2 favourite Irish Lizard finished third.

Only 29 horses ran in the race, the fewest since 1935 when 27 ran. The 1954 running saw four equine fatalities during the race; this remains the only Grand National renewal to have yielded four fatalities. Dominick's Bar dropped dead jumping the second fence; Paris New York incurred a cervical fracture at the fourth. Legal Joy, who finished second two years previously, broke a leg at the 13th and was euthanised, while Coneyburrow was injured at the 28th and was also put down. The two latter fatalities remain the only ones ever recorded at the 13th and 28th fences in the Grand National.

Finishing order

Non-finishers

References

 1954
Grand National
Grand National
Grand National
20th century in Lancashire